Na wylot is the second solo album by Polish rapper and alternative artist Fisz. In 2001 it was nominated to Hip-hop Album of The Year at Fryderyk Awards.

Track listing
"Znużony" - 1:58
"30 cm" (feat. Novika) - 5:04
"S.O.S." (feat. Novika) - 5:25
"Rozmyty" - 5:04
"23:32" - 1:21
"Za wysoko?" - 4:52
"Tajemnica" (feat. Novika)- 5:20
"Zaraz wracam" - 6:19
"1985" - 1:13
"Deszcz" - 4:12
"Dworzec" - 3:52
"Na wylot" - 5:38

Singles
"Tajemnica"
"30 cm"

References

2001 albums
Fisz albums